Yachakan is a 1951 Indian Malayalam-language film, directed by R. Velappan Nair and produced by K. S. Akhileswarayyar. The film stars Prof. M. P. Manmathan, Kottarakkara Sreedharan Nair and Miss Kumari. The musical score is by S. N. Chaami (S. N. Ranganathan).

Cast
 Prof. M. P. Manmathan
 Kottarakkara Sreedharan Nair
 Miss Kumari
 Muthukulam Raghavan Pilla
 Aranmula Ponnamma
 S. P. Pillai
 Achamma
 Pallam Joseph
 Thankam
 Ambalappuzha Krishnamoorthy
 Lakshmikkutti
 Rajamma
 Ambalappuzha Meenakshi
 S. J. Dev
 Thiruvananthapuram Kuttan Pillai

References

External links
 

1951 films
1950s Malayalam-language films